Zhang Jun (1086–1154), was a Chinese military general and politician who fought during the Jin–Song Wars. His battle with Jurchen commander Wuzhu at Mingzhou near the temporary Song capital of Hangzhou briefly halted the Jin advance, giving the Song Emperor Gaozong the chance to flee the city by ship. Soon after, his army suppressed rebellions and banditry in the south alongside the generals Yue Fei, Han Shizhong, Yang Qizhong, and others. Emperor Gaozong diminished the power of the military by moving Yue, Han, and Zhang to civilian positions in 1141. A year later, the Song finished negotiating a peace treaty with the Jin.

Zhang was probably the wealthiest man during the reign of Gaozong of Song. A large portion of his personal wealth consists of rice fields bestowed on him by the emperor.

See also
Yue Fei
Qin Hui
Jin–Song Wars
Timeline of the Jin–Song wars

Citations

Bibliography
 (hardcover)

1086 births
1154 deaths
Jin–Song Wars
Song dynasty chancellors
Song dynasty generals